Municipal Area Express provided mass transportation in suburban Los Angeles. The purpose of the system was to provide rush hour commuter service between the city's southwestern suburbs and the major places of employment near Los Angeles International Airport. Three routes each provided service four times per weekday. Service was discontinued on 28 June 2013.

Route 2: Palos Verdes Peninsula
Traveled through Rancho Palos Verdes, Rolling Hills Estates, Torrance, and Lawndale.

Route 3: San Pedro/Torrance
Traveled through the Los Angeles district of San Pedro, Lomita, Torrance, and Lawndale.

Route 3X: Freeway Express/San Pedro
Traveled non-stop between San Pedro and El Segundo using expressways instead of suburban boulevards.

References

Bus transportation in California
Public transportation in Los Angeles County, California
Transportation in Los Angeles
Transportation in Torrance, California
Lomita, California
San Pedro, Los Angeles